The 2010 Nationwide Tour was the 21st Nationwide Tour season. It ran from January 28 to October 31. The season consisted of 29 official money golf tournaments; six of which were played outside of the United States. The top 25 players on the year-end money list earned their PGA Tour card for 2011.

Schedule
The following table lists official events during the 2010 season.

Money leaders
For full rankings, see 2010 Nationwide Tour graduates.

The money list was based on prize money won during the season, calculated in U.S. dollars. The top 25 players on the tour earned status to play on the 2011 PGA Tour.

Awards

Notes

References

Korn Ferry Tour seasons
Nationwide Tour